Halas and Batchelor was a British animation company founded by husband and wife John Halas and Joy Batchelor. Halas was a Hungarian émigré to the United Kingdom. The company had studios in London and Cainscross, in the Stroud District of Gloucestershire.

History

From 1936, Halas ran a small animation unit that created commercials for theatrical distribution. After independent careers in animation, Halas and Joy Batchelor began working together in 1938. Batchelor responded to Halas's advertisement for an assistant, and they founded Halas and Batchelor in 1940 to create war information and propaganda films. Approximately 70 films were created for the Ministry of Information, the War Office, and the Admiralty over the course of World War II; most of these were shorts intended to improve morale or spur on increased contributions to the war effort, such as Dustbin Parade, about recycling, and Filling the Gap, about gardening. Halas and Batchelor also created a series of anti-fascist cartoons intended for viewing in the Middle East; starring an Arab boy named Abu, who was "enticed and misguided by the forces of Austrian Painter and Mussolini." The heavy workload (at one point the studios were creating a minute-long short every three weeks) and minimal budgets meant that simple animations with economically driven stories were the norm.

HB's first feature film Handling Ships (1945) was the first-ever British animated feature. After the war, they continued making short films while Animal Farm (1954) was being made, erroneously considered the first British animated feature. The studio grew from a small unit to a proper animation company, with several different British locations. Its best-known animation series were Foo Foo (1959–60), Popeye the Sailor (1960–62, for ABC Television in the United States), DoDo, The Kid from Outer Space (1965–70) and The Lone Ranger (1966–69). Halas and Batchelor also produced Snip and Snap (1960) and the animated music video for the song "Love Is All" from Roger Glover's album The Butterfly Ball and the Grasshopper's Feast (1976) and Kraftwerk's Autobahn (1979) by Roger Mainwood. The company also made the short satire Automania 2000, nominated for an Oscar in 1964.

As well as short films, the studio made a few feature films, such as Ruddigore (1967). The company was sold to Tyne Tees Television in the early 1970s, although Halas and Batchelor themselves broke away from this association after a few years. Most of the 2,000 films now form part of The Halas and Batchelor Collection, founded in 1996. This collection was part of a donation by the couple's daughter to the British Film Institute in 2010.

References

External links
Animation Research Centre archive of Halas & Batchelor's films and artwork
Official site
BBC Gloucestershire article about Halas & Batchelor animator Harold Whitaker
 filmography

 
1940 establishments in England
1970s mergers and acquisitions
British animation studios
British companies established in 1940
Film production companies of the United Kingdom
Mass media companies based in London
Mass media companies established in 1940